Leichhardt Power Station is a 60 MW open cycle gas turbine power station near Mount Isa in the Australian state of Queensland. The gas-fired power station was completed in 2014 and is capable of operating on diesel if gas is not available. It contains a single Rolls-Royce Trent 60 gas turbine. It is adjacent to the larger combined cycle Diamantina Power Station for which it provides backup. The power station was built under an engineering, procurement and construction contract by WSP Global. Mount Isa is not on the National Electricity Market, but does have piped natural gas from production in southern Queensland supplied via the Carpentaria Gas Pipeline. Both Diamantina and Leichhardt power stations are owned by APA Group. It retained the long-term gas supply contract with AGL.

References

Power stations in Queensland
2014 establishments in Australia